Cordites is a genus of longhorn beetles of the subfamily Lamiinae, containing the following species:

 Cordites armillata (Thomson, 1868)
 Cordites pubescens (Thomson, 1868)

References

Onciderini